Deshbandhu Mahavidyalaya, also known as Chittaranjan College, established in 1973, is the general degree college at Chittaranjan, in Asansol, Paschim Bardhaman district. It offers undergraduate courses in arts, commerce and sciences. It is affiliated to  Kazi Nazrul University, Asansol.

Departments

Science

Chemistry
Physics
Mathematics

Arts and commerce

Bengali
English
Sanskrit
Hindi
History
Geography
Political Science
Account Department

Accreditation
The college is recognized by the University Grants Commission (UGC).

See also

References

External links
Deshbandhu Mahavidyalaya
Kazi Nazrul University
University Grants Commission
National Assessment and Accreditation Council

Universities and colleges in Paschim Bardhaman district
Colleges affiliated to University of Burdwan
Education in Asansol
Educational institutions established in 1973
1973 establishments in West Bengal